KRWV-LP is a low-power FM radio station in Gold Canyon, Arizona. Broadcasting on 99.3 FM, KRWV is owned by Gold Canyon Public Radio and carries a Classic Hits format.

External links
 

RWV-LP
RWV-LP
Radio stations established in 2014
2015 establishments in Arizona
Classic hits radio stations in the United States